The Zimbabwe national football team (Nicknamed The Warriors), represents Zimbabwe in men's international football and is controlled by the Zimbabwe Football Association (ZIFA), formerly known as the Football Association of Rhodesia. The team has never qualified for the FIFA World Cup finals, but has qualified for the Africa Cup of Nations five times. Zimbabwe has also won the COSAFA Cup a record six times. The team represents both FIFA and Confederation of African Football (CAF).

History
Southern Rhodesia played their first official match against the England Amateur national football team as part of their tour of South Africa and Rhodesia in June 1929. Southern Rhodesia lost their first two matches against England 4–0 and 6–1 respectively. In 1965, following Southern Rhodesia's Unilateral Declaration of Independence as Rhodesia, FIFA requested that the Football Association of Rhodesia reform to be a multi-racial organisation. Prior to this only white Rhodesians were selected for the national football team but after 1965 the team became multi-racial. In 1969, Rhodesia took part in the Oceanic 1970 FIFA World Cup qualification tournament. This was their first attempt to qualify for the FIFA World Cup. Contrary to the team being viewed as the representative team of white Rhodesians, the team was multi-racial including black players. They were drawn against the Australia national football team. Both legs were held in Lourenço Marques, Portuguese Mozambique as the Rhodesian team were unable to get Australian visas. Rhodesia drew the first leg 1–1 but lost the second leg 3–1 thus eliminating Rhodesia from qualification.

In 1980, following the country's reconstitution as Zimbabwe, they played their first FIFA World Cup qualifying match for 11 years against the Cameroon national football team. However they lost 2–1 on aggregate after a 1–0 win in the first leg in Salisbury and a 2–0 loss in the second leg. Following this, the country passed a law that people who held British passports would not be permitted to hold a Zimbabwean passport, which mean that players such as goalkeeper Bruce Grobbelaar were not selected for the national team for 10 years. Following a change in policy that allowed Grobbelaar to play for Zimbabwe, who entered the country on his British passport, Zimbabwe under manager Reinhard Fabisch were one match away from qualifying for the 1994 FIFA World Cup. However, they lost their final qualifying match to Cameroon.

In 2004, Zimbabwe qualified for their first Africa Cup of Nations. During their first match against Egypt, their former anthem "Ishe Komborera Africa" was accidentally played instead of "Simudzai Mureza wedu weZimbabwe", an act which Information Minister Jonathan Moyo called "a cheap attempt by the organisers to demoralise our boys".

In 2015, the Zimbabwe national football team were banned from participating in 2018 FIFA World Cup qualifying due to an unpaid debt to former coach, José Claudinei. At the time, the team was experiencing its strongest period for many years, qualifying for both the 2017 and 2019 Africa Cup of Nations.

On 1 March 2022, Zimbabwe, along with Kenya, was suspended again from international sport due to the interference of the government. Earlier in November 2021, Harare and Nairobi dissolved their federations and were replaced with government-officials. On 31 March, the suspension was made indefinitely and was ratified by FIFA. Suspension is set until Zimbabwe and Kenya meet the demands given by FIFA.

Kit provider

Results and fixtures

The following is a list of match results in the last 12 months, as well as any future matches that have been scheduled.

2021

2022

2023

Coaching history
Caretaker managers are listed in italics.

  Danny McLennan (1965–1969)
  Bill Asprey (1975–1977)
  John Rugg (1980-1981)
  Shepherd Murape (1981–1983)
  Mick Poole (1985)
  Ben Koufie (1988–1992)
  Reinhard Fabisch (1992–1995)
  Rudi Gutendorf (1995–1996)
  Marc Duvillard (1995-1996)
  Bruce Grobbelaar (1996)
  Marc Duvillard (1996-1997)
  Ian Porterfield (1996–1997)
  Sunday Chidzambwa (1997)
  Bruce Grobbelaar (1997)
  Roy Barreto (1997–1998)
  Bruce Grobbelaar (1998)
  Clemens Westerhof (1998–2000)
  Misheck Chidzambwa (2000)
  Sunday Chidzambwa (2000–2002)
  Wiesław Grabowski (2002)
  Sunday Chidzambwa (2003–2004)
  Rahman Gumbo (2004)
  Charles Mhlauri (2004–2007)
  Sunday Chidzambwa (2007)
  Norman Mapeza (2007)
  Luke Masomore (2007)
  José Claudinei (2008)
  Sunday Chidzambwa (2008–2009)
  Norman Mapeza (2009–2010)
  Tom Saintfiet (2010)
  Madinda Ndlovu (2010–2011)
  Norman Mapeza (2011–2012)
  Rahman Gumbo (2012)
  Sean Connor (2012)
  Klaus Dieter Pagels (2012–2013)
  Ian Gorowa (2013–2014)
  Callisto Pasuwa (2015–2017)
  Wilson Mutekede (2017)
  Sunday Chidzambwa (2017–2019)
  Joey Antipas (2019–2020)
  Zdravko Logarušić (2020–2021)
  Norman Mapeza (2021–2022)
  Wilson Mutekede (2022)
  Shepherd Murape (2022–present)

Players

Current squad
The following players were selected for the 2021 Africa Cup of Nations.

Caps and goals are correct as of 18 January 2022, after the match against Guinea.

Recent call-ups
The following players have been called up for Zimbabwe in the last 12 months.

DEC Player refused to join the team after the call-up.
INJ Player withdrew from the squad due to an injury.
PRE Preliminary squad.
RET Player has retired from international football.
SUS Suspended from the national team, red or yellow cards.

Records

Players in bold are still active with Zimbabwe.

Note: U indicates that a player's statistics are unverified.

Competition records

FIFA World Cup record

Africa Cup of Nations record

African Nations Championship record

African Games record
Football at the African Games has been an under-23 tournament since 1991.

COSAFA Cup record

1997 – Qualifying round
1998 – Second place
1999 – Quarter-finals
2000 – Winners
2001 – Second place
2002 – Quarter-finals
2003 – Winners
2004 – Semi-finals
2005 – Winners
2006 – Semi-finals
2007 – First round
2008 – Quarter-finals
2009 – Winners
2010 – Cancelled
2013 – Second place
2015 – Group stage
2016 – Group stage
2017 – Winners
2018 – Winners
2019 – Third place

COSAFA Cup

CECAFA Cup record

1981 – Group stage
1982 – Third place
1983 – Second place
1984 – Group stage
1985 – Winners
1987 – Second place
1988 – Fourth place
1989 – Group stage
1990 – Group stage
2009 – Quarter-finals
2011 – Quarter-finals

Honours
COSAFA Cup
Champions (6): 2000, 2003, 2005, 2009, 2017, 2018
Runners-up (3): 1998, 2001, 2013
CECAFA Cup
Champions (1): 1985
Runners-up (2): 1983, 1987

References

External links

 Zimbabwe Football Association at CAF online
 Zimbabwe Football Association at FIFA

 
African national association football teams